Senegalite is a rare aluminum phosphate. It is a hydrated hydroxy phosphate of aluminum. It is named after Senegal, the country in which it was first found to occur.

The molecular structure of the phosphate mineral senegalite is ⋅3.

References 

Phosphate minerals
Aluminium minerals
Orthorhombic minerals